The 3rd Legislative District of Pennsylvania is located in the northwestern part of the state, and has been represented by Ryan Bizzarro since 2013.

District profile
The 3rd Pennsylvania House of Representatives District is located in Erie County and includes the following areas:
 Fairview Township
 Millcreek Township

Representatives

Recent election results

References

External links
District map from the United States Census Bureau
Pennsylvania House Legislative District Maps from the Pennsylvania Redistricting Commission.  
Population Data for District 3 from the Pennsylvania Redistricting Commission.

Sources

Government of Erie County, Pennsylvania
3